The Titans That Built America is a six-hour, three-part miniseries docudrama which was originally broadcast on the History Channel on May 31, 2021. The series focuses on the lives of Pierre S. du Pont, Walter Chrysler, JP Morgan Jr., William Boeing, Henry Kaiser, Charles Lindbergh, William S. Kundsen, John Raskob, Edsel Ford, and Henry Ford. It serves as a sequel to The Men Who Built America.

The series won the 2022 Realscreen award for Best History & Biography Program.

Cast 
Gerald Kyd as Pierre S. du Pont
Grant Masters as Henry Ford
Cillian O'Gairbhi as Walter Chrysler
Peter O'Meara as J. P. Morgan Jr.
David Crowley as Edsel Ford
Ian Toner as William Boeing
Peter Gaynor as Henry J. Kaiser
Charlie Maher as Charles Lindbergh
Aidan O'Hare as William S. Knudsen
Jonathan Delaney Tynan as John Raskob
Graham Wilkinson as Franklin D. Roosevelt
Vincent Tsang as Wong Tsu

References

External links

2021 American television series debuts
History (American TV channel) original programming
2020s American drama television miniseries
Television series about the history of the United States
American television docudramas
Historical television series
Cultural depictions of Charles Lindbergh
Cultural depictions of Henry Ford